The Future Nostalgia Tour was the second concert tour and first arena tour by Albanian-English singer Dua Lipa, in support of her second studio album, Future Nostalgia (2020). Originally announced in December 2019 and scheduled to take place from April to June of the following year, the tour was postponed several times due to the ongoing COVID-19 pandemic. It began on 9 February 2022 in Miami and concluded on 28 November of that year in Tirana, with several shows throughout North America, Europe, Latin America and Oceania. Griff, Tove Lo, Angèle, Megan Thee Stallion, Caroline Polachek and Lolo Zouaï served as supporting acts on the tour.

Background
On 2 December 2019, Lipa formally announced the Future Nostalgia tour, with 24 shows across the UK and Europe from April to June of the following year. Tickets went on sale four days later. Several tiers of VIP tickets were also offered, including ones that included meet and greets with the singer and one where fans could battle Lipa in a game of Dance Dance Revolution. The album's title track was released in conjunction with the tour announcement. On 13 January 2020, Lipa announced British DJ Buck Betty and American singer Lolo Zouaï as supporting acts for the tour. On 21 February 2020, the singer announced two new UK shows in Liverpool and Nottingham, with tickets for those dates going on sale a week later. On 23 March 2020, Lipa announced that she had been forced to postpone the tour due to the COVID-19 pandemic; she also revealed that she was planning tour dates for the rest of the world. Rescheduled tour dates for January and February 2021 were announced the following day with Betty and Zouaï still scheduled as supporting acts. Shows in Copenhagen, Stockholm and Oslo were cancelled due to the inability to be rescheduled and the Vienna and Munich shows were still attempting to be rescheduled at that time, but not formally cancelled. Tickets for the original shows remained valid and tickets for the cancelled shows were refunded.

The tour was postponed for a second time to September and October 2021 on 23 October 2020 with it being unconfirmed if Betty and Zouaï would still support her. Following this, Lipa announced a livestream concert titled Studio 2054, which was developed after she was unable to tour for her album. After the concert on 27 November 2020, ticket sales for the tour increased by 70 percent. On 28 June 2021, the tour was rescheduled for a third time to April, May and June 2022. With this postponement, several new shows across Europe were announced along with the rescheduled Vienna and Munich shows; tickets went on sale that week. Lipa announced North American shows for February, March and April 2022 on 13 September 2021, with Megan Thee Stallion, Caroline Polachek and Zouaï as supporting acts. Tickets went on sale four days later, with several VIP upgrade packages available. A second show in Los Angeles was announced on 17 September due to popular demand with tickets for that show going on sale a week later. The November 2022 Oceania leg of the tour was announced on 19 September 2021, with tickets going on sale four days later; a pre-sale occurred in the 24 hours prior. Extra dates in Auckland, Sydney and Melbourne were announced on 25 September 2021 after several shows sold out very fast; tickets for those shows went on sale three days later.

On 22 November 2021, Lipa announced four new European dates in Lithuania and Scandinavia; tickets for these shows went on sale four days later. Also with this announcement, Angèle, Griff and Tove Lo were announced as the new opening acts. On 10 December 2021, the Latin America tour dates were announced for September 2022 with tickets going on sale three days later. Tickets for the Buenos Aires show sold out in less than an hour, thus, a second show in the city was announced on 16 December and tickets for that show went on sale the following day. On 24 January 2022, the Montreal and Toronto shows on the North American leg were postponed to July 2022, with Polachek and Zouaï still scheduled as supporting acts. The reason for the postponement was not revealed however it was speculated to be due to the COVID-19 restrictions in the cities. In response to this, two new shows in Milwaukee and Elmont were announced the following day, replacing the two postponed shows. Tickets for these shows went on sale three days following the announcement. A show in São Paulo was announced on 16 May 2022 set to be included on the Latin American leg of the tour in September 2022. Pre-sale tickets for this show will go in the two days following the announcement and tickets for the general public will go on sale on 19 May. On 15 November 2022, Lipa announced the final show of the tour, in the Albanian capital of Tirana on 28 November 2022, the Albanian Flag Day and the 110th anniversary of Albanian independence. The tour is produced by Ceremony London, promoted by Live Nation and sponsored by Truly Hard Seltzer.

Concert synopsis
The concert began with the house lights lowering as "Body Funk" (2017) by Purple Disco Machine began playing over the speakers and the stage backdrop cut to static before revealing the words "In Stereocolor: Future Nostalgia" with Miami Vice-styled graphics. A 1980s aerobics-themed video montage that introduced the ten dancers that included two roller skaters was then played as the first notes of "Physical" began playing. Lipa then strutted on stage to a ballet barre in centre stage to perform the song. She wore a custom Balenciaga neon-yellow catsuit that featured a lingerie-inspired corseted bodice, built-in pants and heeled boots, a textured floral pattern and matching elbow-length opera gloves while she also had rhinestones on her eyelids and wore diamond-embellished Eéra earrings. The outfit was inspired by the label's summer 2022 red carpet collection. Her dancers wore royal blue outfits, also by the design house, with some sporting long sleeve spandex outfits and others wearing baggy tracksuits made from cotton terry jersey. During the song's performance, they performed 1980s aerobic choreography and Lipa vamped down the runway of the stage. The setup included a main stage and a smaller stage near the middle of the arena, connected by a runway. Lipa's band, consisting of a keyboardist, drummer, guitarist, bassist and four backup singers, appeared on a slightly lower stage on the wings of the main one.

Following this, there was a seamless transition into "New Rules" where Lipa and her dancers performed choreography similar to that of the song's accompanying music video, including strutting down the runway using umbrella props in the style of Singin' in the Rain (1952). The big screen during the song featured flamingos and retro cars, also similar to the song's music video alongside a personalized screen for the city the concert took place. In the following song "Love Again", Lipa performed square dance choreography and lassoing technique similar to those used in the song's music video. The backdrop for the song had a Martian space western theme. For "Cool", Lipa performed with a mic stand centre stage in the shadow a CGI disco ball as two dancers in light-up rollerblades skated around her. Lipa sang "Pretty Please", "Break My Heart" and "Be the One" before sprinting off stage for a costume change. Simultaneously, an interlude featuring an elevator music-like muted version "IDGAF" and a graphic novel theme titled "Under the Sea" that included a lobster attack was played.

Going into the second act, Lipa changed into a shimmery, sequin-studded silver and white one piece bodysuit with a one-armed top and briefs-style bottoms. "We're Good" was the first song performed in the act, which she sang in front of a giant lobster prop. A menu was featured on the side screen that included fake menu items such as the "Dua thermadore". The song was followed by "Good In Bed" and "Fever". The former song featured a technicolor barrage of cherries for the backdrop. Lipa attached a white, flowing train to her outfit to perform "Boys Will Be Boys" with a spotlight on her, which led into a Club Future Nostalgia interlude for the third act. The interlude included a bombastic carnaval-like parade with the performers dancing down the runway. Lipa changed into a Marine Serre outfit that included a pink lace bra and black skin-tight jacket alongside matching black high-waisted underwear, sneakers and hot pink tights with the brand's signature crescent moon motif for the third act. For the third act of the European leg, Lipa wore a Dior outfit by John Galliano. The performances for this act took place at the end of the runway stage under low neon lights that looked like a night club. She performed "One Kiss" and "Electricity" with her backup dancers. "Hallucinate" followed where Lipa and her dancers performed warehouse rave-influenced choreography, jumping around a secondary stage in the set. The final song of the third act was "Cold Heart" where Lipa duetted with a pre-recorded video of Elton John while sitting on the stage with her dancers.

In the final act, Lipa wore a sparkling black Mugler catsuit covered in 120,000 crystals with beige mesh cutouts as well as sheer and opaque body-defining panels. The outfit was similar to that of Cher's "If I Could Turn Back Time" outfit, and was paired with matching black gloves. The dancers wore also wore outfits by the fashion house, some in similar body suits to the singer and some with a cut out black top and matching trousers. For this act, a glittering moon and stars we're brought down and the singer performed "Levitating" while hovering above the general admission crowd on a moving platform before waving goodbye and running off stage. She was surrounded by hanging iridescent planets and stars with a galaxy image on the big screen. In the encore, the singer belted an aggressive take of the album's title track where she whipped her hair around and walked the runway while teal and dark purple laser lights were used. The show closed with a performance of "Don't Start Now" which opens with the singer reclaiming a dance move she performed during promotion for her eponymous debut studio album that caused her to be bullied online for it being "lazy" and "uninspired" as well as become a meme for the dance. Lipa stated that she looks back at the dance from a different perspective with "fondness" as, although the bullying caused her a lot of grief, it caused her to work harder and grow into the artist she wanted to become. Confetti cannons go off during the performance. The show lasted for approximately 90 minutes.

Critical reception
The Future Nostalgia Tour was met with highly positive reviews from critics. E! Online named the tour one of 15 "must-see" concerts in 2022. In a review from Rolling Stone, Celia Almeida praised Lipa's stage presence stating she's a "superstar" that's "every bit the female alpha she proclaimed herself to be on the album’s title track" while also mentioning that the show is "a powerful reminder of Lipa's pop savvy". For Consequence, Mary Gibson stated that "Lipa delivered exactly the kind of lively, dynamic show fans have been aching for". Adam Graham of The Detroit News praised the "rich" production that "worked like clockwork" and complimented Lipa's stage presence saying her "confidence and her control of the stage was the best stage trick of the night". The Columbus Dispatchs Margaret Quamme commended the "loose, joyous" choreography that lets the "glossy, admittedly shallow disco-tinged" set list breathe. Emmalyse Brownstein of Miami New Times commended singer's vocals stating they sound "just like her studio recordings" while also praised Lipa's "impressive" stage presence for commanding the stage and leading the dancers. The Tennessean reviewer Dave Paulson praised the concert for being "beyond well-rehearsed, and synchronized down to the millisecond", while also appreciating the singer's stage presence stating she is "self-assured" and "a cool, consistent presence than a diva aiming to set the stage ablaze".

In The Charlotte Observer, Théoden Janes complimented Lipa's performance, which he praised for hitting "pretty much all of her marks" in "terms of her command over her vocals and her command over her body". Edward Pevos of MLive named it "one of the most well-paced shows we've seen many years" while praising Lipa for commanding "the stage like a seasoned pro". Writing for The Oakland Press, Gary Graff said Lipa ticked "off all the boxes we expect from these kinds of shows". Writing for The Boston Globe, Maura Johnston said the show "leaned into that kitchen-sink mode feeling of the present while also offering an escape" while describing Lipa as "a charismatic performer with a striking look" that "commanded the stage". Dan DeLuca of The Philadelphia Inquirer praised the tight choreography and Lipa's "more-than-capable" vocals. In a more negative review from OnMilwaukee, Matt Mueller praised the "spectacle" show production but criticized Lipa's performance and stage presence, saying that at times her backup dancers stole the show.

For Expresso, after Lisbon's show, Rita Carmo, also complimented the show, stating "Don't they make pop stars like they used to? Wrong. Dua Lipa proved tonight, in Lisbon, that she has the fiber of someone who came to stay in a musical territory used to chewing and throwing away. In just over five years, the British artist, of Albanian origin, went from a proposal that was perhaps too alternative to widespread acclaim, achieving the feat of pleasing both the masses and those who look at these pop things with some cynicism".

Commercial reception
Pitchfork named the Future Nostalgia Tour one of the most anticipated tours of 2022. The tour debuted at number five on the February 2022 issue of Billboards Top Tours Boxscore chart with a total gross of $13,523,248 and a total attendance of 138,638, from 11 shows. The following month, it dropped down to number seven with a total gross of $25,027,606 and a total attendance of 239,855 from 17 shows. The first leg grossed $40,100,000 and sold 394,000 tickets, an increase of 346% in ticket sales and 1,479% in gross-per-show compared to when Lipa toured the US in support of her debut album. In every city except Milwaukee, ticket sales topped 11,000; Milwaukee's Fiserv Forum had a scaled down capacity and only sold 6,312 tickets. The highest grossing show of the leg was the show of 1 March 2022 in New York City grossing $2,100,000 while the following night in Washington D.C. had the highest ticket sales with 16,068 tickets sold. The shows in Inglewood had a gross of $3,228,158 and an attendance of 30,270, causing it to chart at number 29 on the March 2022 issue of Billboards Top Boxscores chart.

Set list
This set list is representative of the show on 9 February 2022 in Miami. It is not representative of all concerts for the duration of the tour.

Act 1
"Physical"
"New Rules"
"Love Again"
"Cool"
"Pretty Please"
"Break My Heart" (contains elements of "D.A.N.C.E." by Justice)
"Be the One"
Act 2
"We're Good" (contains a prelude with elements of "IDGAF" by Lipa and a video interlude titled "Lobster Attack")
"Good in Bed"
"Fever"
"Boys Will Be Boys"

Act 3
 Club Future Nostalgia Medley (contains elements of "Boys Will Be Boys" (Zach Witness remix), "Cool" (Jayda G remix), "Hallucinate" (Mr. Fingers deep stripped mix), "Love Again" (Horse Meat Disco remix), "Levitating" (the Blessed Madonna remix), and "Groovin' You" by Harvey Mason)
"One Kiss" (contains elements of "One Kiss" (Oliver Heldens remix))
"Electricity" (contains elements of "Lady (Hear Me Tonight)" by Modjo)
"Hallucinate" (contains elements of "Together" by Together and "Technologic" by Daft Punk)
"Cold Heart"
Act 4
"Levitating"
Encore
"Future Nostalgia"
"Don't Start Now" (contains elements of "Don't Start Now" (Live in L.A. remix) and "Gimme! Gimme! Gimme! (A Man After Midnight)" by ABBA)

Notes
 Angèle joined Lipa to perform "Fever" at the concerts on 1 March in New York City, 2 and 3 May in London, 15 May in Paris and 9 June in Barcelona.
 "Sweetest Pie" was added to the set list between "Good in Bed" and "Fever" at the concerts on 15, 17 and 20 March 2022 in Denver, Tulsa and Phoenix; Megan Thee Stallion joined Lipa to perform the song on all dates.
 Starting from the concert on 9 June, "Levitating" and "Future Nostalgia" were swapped on the set list with "Levitating" being performed before "Don't Start Now".

Shows

Cancelled shows

Personnel
Credits adapted from DublinLive, Dincwear and the BIMM Institute.

Band:
 Dua Lipa – lead vocals
 Georgie Ward – keyboards
 Duayne Sanford – drums
 Matty Carroll – bass
 Alex Lanyon – guitar
 Ciara O'Connor – backing vocals
 Izzy Chase – backing vocals
 Naomi Scarlett – backing vocals
 Matt Maijah – backing vocals
Show:
 Zacc Milne – dancer
 Sammi Lee Jayne – dancer
 Demi Rox – dancer
 Sharon June – dancer
 Robyn Rae Laud – dancer
 Fatou Bah – dancer
 Didde Mie – dancer
 Lamaar Manning – dancer
 Kane Horn – dancer
 Thanh Jason Nguyen – dancer
 Darion Reyes – skate roller
 Bobby West – skate roller

See also
 Studio 2054

Footnotes

References

2022 concert tours
Concert tours of Australia
Concert tours of Canada
Concert tours of Europe
Concert tours of Germany
Concert tours of Ireland
Concert tours of the Netherlands
Concert tours of North America
Concert tours of Oceania
Concert tours postponed due to the COVID-19 pandemic
Concert tours of South America
Concert tours of the United Kingdom
Concert tours of the United States
Dua Lipa